George Baker (born 28 October 1946) is an Anglo-Indian actor and politician. He is primarily known for his works in Bengali and Assamese language films. He is one of the two Members of Parliament appointed by the president under Article 331 (Anglo-Indian) of the Indian Constitution. He joined the Bharatiya Janata Party in 2014 and contested and lost the Lok Sabha elections from the Howrah constituency during the 2014 Indian general election.

Biography

Early life and education
George Baker was born in a Greek family. His parents migrated to India via Britain shortly before he was born. His initial education was in Lucknow at La Martiniere College. He was a National level junior in Boxing and Swimming during this period. He later joined the Assam Engineering College but had  to leave midway since his father died. He completed a two-year course in Permanent Way Engineering and joined the Northeast Frontier Railway zone in the Engineering Department. He served here for two years and then quit to start his own business.

Acting career (Early 1970s – present)
Baker made his first foray into Assamese cinema in 1974. He played the protagonist in the Assamese film Chameli Memsaab. This film went on to win the National Film Award for Best Feature Film in Assamese at the 23rd National Film Awards. He played the role of Berkeley, a British planter who falls for a native girl, Chameli, (played by Binita Borgohain) and is later accused for her murder. Baker later played the same role in the Bengali version of the same movie.

He went on to act in numerous Bengali movies, Jatra, television films, serials mostly playing parts of British Expatriates. He has also been part of roving theatre groups.

Over the years he has acted in films of five languages – Assamese, Bengali, English, Hindi & Santhali.

More recently he played the role of Sir William Eckhardt in Parineeta and Mr. Ramsey in Bhooter Bhabishyat.

Political career (2014)

On 27 February 2014, the Bharatiya Janata Party announced Baker as their candidate for the 2014 Indian general election from the Howrah (Lok Sabha constituency).

On 23 July 2015, he was appointed to the 16th Lok Sabha as one of the two appointed members representing the Anglo-Indian community along with Richard Hay.

On 24 June 2017, he was attacked by a mob, allegedly composed of Trinamool Congress members, and then hospitalised.

Filmography

See also
Bharatiya Janata Party
Howrah
Cinema of Assam
Cinema of West Bengal
Jatra (theatre)
Northeast Frontier Railway zone
Tezpur
Santhali

References

External links
 

1946 births
Bharatiya Janata Party politicians from West Bengal
Bengali male actors
Living people
Male actors in Bengali cinema
Assamese-language actors
Assamese actors
National Democratic Alliance candidates in the 2014 Indian general election
Nominated members of the Lok Sabha
People from Tezpur
Anglo-Indian people
India MPs 2014–2019
Indian people of Greek descent
Indian actor-politicians
Male actors in Assamese cinema